Aracoma is an unincorporated community in Logan County, West Virginia, United States. Aracoma lies along West Virginia Route 10 on the Guyandotte River north of Logan. Aracoma was named for Aracoma, the daughter of the Shawnee Chief Cornstalk.

References

Unincorporated communities in Logan County, West Virginia
Unincorporated communities in West Virginia
Populated places on the Guyandotte River